Sir Jenkin Coles  (19 January 1843 – 6 December 1911) was a South Australian politician. He was a member of the South Australian House of Assembly from 1875 to 1878 and 1881 to 1911, representing the electorates of Light (1875–78, 1881–1902) and Wooroora (1902–1911). He was Leader of the Opposition from 1886 to 1887 and later served as Speaker of the House of Assembly from 1890 to 1911.

Early life
Coles was the son of Jenkin and Caroline Coles, came of an old north of Ireland family, and was born at Liverpool, New South Wales. When he was seven years old his family returned to Europe, and he was educated at Christ's Hospital School, Horsham.

Career
Coles' parents came to Australia again in 1858 and settled at Adelaide, South Australia. Coles obtained a position as a junior clerk with the Murray River Navigation office, but gave this up to become assistant dispenser and receiver of stores at the Adelaide hospital for three years. He then joined the mounted police and served for three years in the country. On leaving this service he became an auctioneer and stock salesman and a member of the real estate firm of Coles and Goodchild, with which James White was later associated. The business prospered so much that Coles was able to practically retire from it before he was 40. He was returned to the South Australian House of Assembly as member for Light in 1875, but did not stand at the 1878 election as he found that the strain of carrying on both business and parliamentary duties was too great. In 1881 he was elected for Light, afterwards merged into Wooroora, and represented the district for over 30 years. He was commissioner of crown lands from June 1884 to February 1885, and commissioner of public works from February to June 1885 in the second John Colton ministry and showed himself to be a vigorous administrator. He was commissioner of crown lands again in the Thomas Playford II ministry from June 1887 to June 1889. In 1890 he was elected speaker of the house of assembly in succession to Sir John Bray, and held the position until he resigned, about three weeks before his death of Bright's disease on 6 December 1911. He married in 1865 Ellen Henrietta Briggs, who survived him with four sons and seven daughters. Two of his sons founded the auctioneering firm Coles Brothers of Kapunda.  He was created K.C.M.G. in 1894.

Coles was speaker for 21 years and 165 days, a then record in Australia, and until his last illness never missed a sitting. He had a great knowledge of the standing orders and was firm, tactful, alert and wise. He was thoroughly respected on both sides of the house, his rulings and requests were always obeyed, and under his sway the house of assembly in South Australia established a high reputation for the orderly conduct of its business.

References

 

|-

|-

|-

|-

|-

1843 births
1911 deaths
People educated at Christ's Hospital
Australian Knights Commander of the Order of St Michael and St George
Members of the South Australian House of Assembly
Speakers of the South Australian House of Assembly
Leaders of the Opposition in South Australia
Australian real estate businesspeople
Australian auctioneers
19th-century Australian businesspeople